The Grouch Club is a talk show broadcast on CBS Radio West Coast on Mondays (later Tuesdays) between October 17, 1938 and April 25, 1939, followed on Sundays at 6:30 PM on NBC Red Network April 16, 1939 through January 21, 1940. Jack Lescoulie hosted as “grouchmaster”, listening to people who wanted to complain about any problem in their life. Among the “grouchies” featured were familiar radio personalities (some also in movies): Jack Albertson, Arthur Q. Bryan (the future voice of Elmer Fudd), Emory Parnell, Ned Sparks, Don Brody, Mary Milford, Phil Kramer and Eric Burtis. Beth Wilson was a key singer and the hosts were Neil Reagan and Jim Barry. A key producer was a top movie screenwriter Owen Crump. Roland Kibbee was among the writers.  The show was created by Nat Hiken.

Simultaneous to the show was a series of 9- to 10-minute comedy short films also co-written and co-starring on screen, Jack Lescoulie. These were produced by Warner Bros. through Vitaphone. Arthur Q. Bryan and Nancy Evans often appeared in these, which showcased an unfortunate soul struggling with library book cards, voting trouble, parking problems and other troubles… warranting an entrance in the “Grouch Club”.

Only six films were made in 1938-1939, the first of which eventually made it to DVD as an “extra” with the feature The Roaring Twenties. Lloyd French was key director.

The Great Library Misery / September 10, 1938
Tax Trouble(s) / March 18, 1939
Witness Trouble / July 29, 1939
Vote Trouble / September  9, 1939
No Parking / December 22, 1939
Trouble in Store / December 23, 1939

See also
List of short subjects by Hollywood studio#Warner Bros.

References

 Roy Liebman Vitaphone Films – A Catalogue of the Features and Shorts 2003 McFarland & Company
 Motion Pictures 1912-1939 Catalog of Copyright Entries 1951 Library of Congress

1938 radio programme debuts
1940 radio programme endings
CBS Radio programs
1930s American radio programs
Vitaphone short films
Warner Bros. short films